Tanya Isolina Acosta (born ) is an Argentine volleyball player. She is a member of the Argentina women's national volleyball team since 2010.

She participated at the Pan-American Volleyball Cup (in 2013, 2014 2015, 2016), the FIVB Volleyball World Grand Prix (in 2013, 2014, 2015, 2016), the 2014 FIVB Volleyball Women's World Championship in Italy, the 2015 FIVB Volleyball Women's World Cup in Japan and at the 2016 Olympic Games in Rio de Janeiro.

At club level, she played for Estudiantes de Paraná, San Francisco Volley Córdoba, Instituto de Córdoba, Club de Gimnasia y Esgrima (La Plata) and Terville before moving to Esporte Clube Pinheiros in September 2016.

Clubs
  Estudiantes de Paraná
  San Francisco Volley Córdoba
  Instituto de Córdoba (–2010)
  Gimnasia y Esgrima (LP) (2010–2015)
  Terville Florange Olympique Club (2015–2016)
  Esporte Clube Pinheiros (2016–2017)
  Gimnasia y Esgrima (LP)   (2017- 2019)
  Regatas Lima   (2019-2021)
  Gimnasia y Esgrima La Plata   (2021-2022)

References

External links
 Profile  at Esporte Clube Pinheiros
 Player profile at volleybox.net 

1991 births
Living people
Argentine women's volleyball players
Sportspeople from Entre Ríos Province
Olympic volleyball players of Argentina
Volleyball players at the 2016 Summer Olympics
Outside hitters
Expatriate volleyball players in France
Expatriate volleyball players in Brazil
Argentine expatriate sportspeople in France
Argentine expatriate sportspeople in Brazil
Pan American Games medalists in volleyball
Pan American Games bronze medalists for Argentina
Volleyball players at the 2019 Pan American Games
Medalists at the 2019 Pan American Games